The 1925 Humboldt State Lumberjacks football team represented Humboldt State College during the 1925 college football season. They competed as an independent. 1925 was the second year for Humboldt State football and they only played four games against local high schools. The team was led by head coach Cy Falkenberg in his only year as coach.

Schedule

References

Humboldt State
Humboldt State Lumberjacks football seasons
Humboldt State Lumberjacks football